Philip Burger (born 28 August 1980 in Pretoria, South Africa) is a rugby union player.

He is a Springbok Rugby Sevens player, and represented South Africa at the 2006 Melbourne Commonwealth Games. He was the top try scorer at the IRB Sevens tournament in George, South Africa in 2006. He is the son of 3-times capped Bok, Thys Burger.

Burger played Currie Cup rugby for the Free State Cheetahs from 2005 to 2007. In 2006 he was the top try scorer in the Currie Cup competition. Burger won the Currie Cup with the Cheetahs in 2005 and in 2006 (when the Cheetahs shared it with the Bulls).
He played Super 14 Rugby for the Cheetahs in 2007. He is in the current squad for the French Club USA Perpignan, in the Heineken Cup and Top 14, and was part of the title winning squad in 2008/09.

Notes

External links

itsrugby.co.uk Profile

1980 births
Living people
Afrikaner people
South African rugby union players
Rugby union fullbacks
Cheetahs (rugby union) players
Free State Cheetahs players
Griffons (rugby union) players
USA Perpignan players
Rugby union players from Pretoria
South Africa international rugby sevens players
Male rugby sevens players
Rugby sevens players at the 2006 Commonwealth Games
Commonwealth Games rugby sevens players of South Africa